Luis Contreras (September 18, 1950 – June 20, 2004) was an American character actor. The son of actor Roberto Contreras, his film debut was in  Close Encounters of the Third Kind.   Contreras often played the parts of bums, gang members, police officers, prison inmates, and criminals. One of the typical roles that he played as a gang member or criminal was that of Jesus in Walking the Edge.

Contreras appeared in multiple movies for director Walter Hill: The Long Riders, 48 Hrs., Extreme Prejudice, Red Heat, Geronimo: An American Legend, and Last Man Standing.

He died of cancer in 2004 at the age of 53.

Filmography

References

External links

2004 deaths
1950 births